Isorineloricaria spinosissima, also known as the zucchini catfish, is a species of Loricariidae endemic to the Guayas River basin in  western Ecuador. This species grows to a length of  TL.

References

Loricariidae
Catfish of South America
Freshwater fish of Ecuador
Endemic fauna of Ecuador
Taxa named by Franz Steindachner
Fish described in 1880